Glyptopetalum is a genus of plant in the family Celastraceae.

Species
 The Plant List recognises 34 accepted species:

 Glyptopetalum acuminatissimum  
 Glyptopetalum angulatum  
 Glyptopetalum annamense  
 Glyptopetalum aquifolium  
 Glyptopetalum calocarpum  
 Glyptopetalum calyptratum  
 Glyptopetalum chaudocense  
 Glyptopetalum continentale  
 Glyptopetalum euonymoides  
 Glyptopetalum euphlebium  
 Glyptopetalum feddei  
 Glyptopetalum fengii  
 Glyptopetalum geloniifolium  
 Glyptopetalum gracilipes  
 Glyptopetalum grandiflorum  
 Glyptopetalum harmandianum  
 Glyptopetalum ilicifolium  
 Glyptopetalum integrifolium  
 Glyptopetalum lawsonii  
 Glyptopetalum loheri  
 Glyptopetalum longipedicellatum  
 Glyptopetalum longipedunculatum  
 Glyptopetalum marivelense  
 Glyptopetalum palawanense  
 Glyptopetalum poilanei  
 Glyptopetalum quadrangulare  
 Glyptopetalum reticulinerve  
 Glyptopetalum rhytidophyllum  
 Glyptopetalum sclerocarpum  
 Glyptopetalum stixifolium  
 Glyptopetalum subcordatum  
 Glyptopetalum thorelii  
 Glyptopetalum tonkinense  
 Glyptopetalum zeylanicum

References

SAVINOV IVAN A. TAXONOMIC REVISION OF ASIAN GENUS GLYPTOPETALUM THWAITES (CELASTRACEAE R. BR.) // REINWARDTIA. 2014. Vol. 14(1): 183–192.

 
Celastrales genera
Taxonomy articles created by Polbot